Zoltan Norman (5 December 1919 – 2001) was a Romanian water polo player. He competed in the men's tournament at the 1952 Summer Olympics.

See also
 Romania men's Olympic water polo team records and statistics
 List of men's Olympic water polo tournament goalkeepers

References

External links
 

1919 births
2001 deaths
Sportspeople from Timișoara
Romanian male water polo players
Water polo goalkeepers
Olympic water polo players of Romania
Water polo players at the 1952 Summer Olympics